is a Japanese heptathlete. She won a silver medal at the 2011 Asian Championships and finished fourth at the 2013 Asian Championships.

International competition

References

External links

Fumie Takehara at Hasegawa Sports Facilities  (archived)

1987 births
Living people
Sportspeople from Hyōgo Prefecture
Japanese heptathletes